Françoise Dastur (born 1942 in Lyon) is a French philosopher. She is Professor Emeritus at University of Nice Sophia Antipolis. She is a specialist of the works of Martin Heidegger.

Bibliography
 Heidegger and the Question of Time (Contemporary Studies in Philosophy and the Human Sciences), translated by François Raffoul and David Pettigrew, Humanity Books, 1998 
 Death: An Essay on Finitude, translated by John Llewelyn, Continuum, 2002
 Telling Time: Sketch of a Phenomenological Chronology (Athlone Contemporary European Thinkers), translated by Edward Bullard, The Athlone Press, 2000
 How Are We to Confront Death?: An Introduction to Philosophy (Perspectives in Continental Philosophy), Robert Vallier (Translator), David Farrell Krell (Foreword), Fordham University Press, 2012
 Questioning Phenomenology (Perspectives in Continental Philosophy), translated by Robert Vallier, Fordham University Press, 2011
 Heidegger et la question du temps, PUF, « Philosophies », Paris, 1990
 Hölderlin, tragédie et modernité, Encre Marine, Fougères, 1992.
 Dire le temps. Esquisse d’une chrono-logie phénoménologique, Encre Marine, Fougères, 1994, deuxième édition (Encre Marine, Livre de poche), 2002.
 La Mort. Essai sur la finitude, Hatier, Paris, 1994.
 Husserl, Des mathématiques à l’histoire, PUF, collection « Philosophies », Paris, 1995
 Hölderlin. Le retournement natal, Encre Marine, Fougères, La Versanne, 1997.
 Comment vivre avec la mort ?, Éditions Pleins feux, Nantes, 1998.
 Chair et langage. Essais sur Merleau-Ponty, Encre Marine, 2001.
 Heidegger et la question anthropologique, Peeters, Leuven, 2003.
 Philosophie et Différence, Éditions de La Transparence, 2004.
 La phénoménologie en questions : Langage, altérité, temporalité, finitude, Vrin, Paris, 2004.
 À la naissance des choses : Art, poésie et philosophie, Encre Marine, 2005.
 Comment affronter la mort ?, Bayard, Paris, 2005.
 La Mort. Essai sur la finitude, PUF, Paris, 2007.
 Heidegger. La question du logos, Vrin, Paris, 2007.
 Daseinsanalyse (avec Ph. Cabestan), Vrin, Paris, 2011.
 Heidegger et la pensée à venir, Vrin, Paris, 2011.

References

20th-century French philosophers
21st-century French philosophers
Hermeneutists
Phenomenologists
Continental philosophers
Daseinsanalysis
Existentialists
French women philosophers
Philosophy academics
Heidegger scholars
Living people
Writers from Lyon
1942 births
Historians of philosophy
Philosophers of death